Bei Di may refer to:
Beidi, "Northern Barbarians" who lived in northern China during the Zhou Dynasty
Pak Tai, the "Northern Emperor" celebrated in some Chinese cultures
Betty Pei Ti (born 1951), Taiwanese actress